The British Agricultural Revolution, or Second Agricultural Revolution, was an unprecedented increase in agricultural production in Britain arising from increases in labour and land productivity between the mid-17th and late 19th centuries. Agricultural output grew faster than the population over the hundred-year period ending in 1770, and thereafter productivity remained among the highest in the world. This increase in the food supply contributed to the rapid growth of population in England and Wales, from 5.5 million in 1700 to over 9 million by 1801, though domestic production gave way increasingly to food imports in the 19th century as the population more than tripled to over 35 million. Using 1700 as a base year (=100), agricultural output per agricultural worker in Britain steadily increased from about 50 in 1500, to around 65 in 1550, to 90 in 1600, to over 100 by 1650, to over 150 by 1750, rapidly increasing to over 250 by 1850. The rise in productivity accelerated the decline of the agricultural share of the labour force, adding to the urban workforce on which industrialization depended: the Agricultural Revolution has therefore been cited as a cause of the Industrial Revolution.

However, historians continue to dispute when exactly such a "revolution" took place and of what it consisted. Rather than a single event, G. E. Mingay states that there were a "profusion of agricultural revolutions, one for two centuries before 1650, another emphasising the century after 1650, a third for the period 1750–1780, and a fourth for the middle decades of the nineteenth century". This has led more recent historians to argue that any general statements about "the Agricultural Revolution" are difficult to sustain.

One important change in farming methods was the move in crop rotation to turnips and clover in place of fallow. Turnips can be grown in winter and are deep-rooted, allowing them to gather minerals unavailable to shallow-rooted crops. Clover fixes nitrogen from the atmosphere into a form of fertiliser. This permitted the intensive arable cultivation of light soils on enclosed farms and provided fodder to support increased livestock numbers whose manure added further to soil fertility.

Term 
Called “British,” the term implies that the revolution began in Britain. The term does not imply that the revolution existed solely in Britain. Other countries in Europe, East Asia and North America followed suit in the next two centuries. The Second Agricultural Revolution was much like the Neolithic Revolution in that it occurred in many regions across the world in a short span of time.

The British origins of the revolution is the view shared by the British historians. The Dutch historians disagree. In the Netherlands between 1500 and 1650, the agricultural output per laborer rose by 80% leading to over 60% decline in manpower engaged in agriculture by 1650. From 1500 to 1750, the Dutch were faster than Britain in reducing the agricultural sector of population. The Netherlands were called "school room," or "home" of the modern agricultural revolution. Notably, one of the innovations in the British Revolution was the “Dutch” light plow. English landowners and their agents who returned from exile in the Netherlands in the 17th century introduced Dutch methods and techniques.

The term "revolution" refers only to increase in yields per land and labour. There was not anything revolutionary in agricultural technology or methods, only usual innovations. Power tillers appeared on fields in the 20th century, synthetic fertilizers in the 19th century, and the light plow was used all around the Mediterranean since antiquity. One hypothesis suggests climatic amelioration as the trigger of the revolution. This explanation also associates with the Neolithic Revolution.

Major developments and innovations
The British Agricultural Revolution was the result of the complex interaction of social, economic and farming technological changes.  Major developments and innovations include:

 Norfolk four-course crop rotation: fodder crops, particularly turnips and clover, replaced leaving the land fallow. 
 The Dutch improved the Chinese plough so that it could be pulled with fewer oxen or horses.
 Enclosure: the removal of common rights to establish exclusive ownership of land
 Development of a national market free of tariffs, tolls and customs barriers
 Transportation infrastructures, such as improved roads, canals, and later, railways
 Land conversion, land drains and reclamation
 Increase in farm size
 Selective breeding

Crop rotation

One of the most important innovations of the British Agricultural Revolution was the development of the Norfolk four-course rotation, which greatly increased crop and livestock yields by improving soil fertility and reducing fallow.

Crop rotation is the practice of growing a series of dissimilar types of crops in the same area in sequential seasons to help restore plant nutrients and mitigate the build-up of pathogens and pests that often occurs when one plant species is continuously cropped. Rotation can also improve soil structure and fertility by alternating deep-rooted and shallow-rooted plants. Turnip roots, for example, can recover nutrients from deep under the soil. The Norfolk four-course system, as it is now known, rotates crops so that different crops are planted with the result that different kinds and quantities of nutrients are taken from the soil as the plants grow. An important feature of the Norfolk four-field system was that it used labour at times when demand was not at peak levels.

Planting cover crops such as turnips and clover was not permitted under the common field system because they interfered with access to the fields. Besides, other people's livestock could graze the turnips. During the Middle Ages, the open-field system had initially used a two-field crop rotation system where one field was left fallow or turned into pasture for a time to try to recover some of its plant nutrients. Later they employed a three-year, three field crop rotation routine, with a different crop in each of two fields, e.g. oats, rye, wheat, and barley with the second field growing a legume like peas or beans, and the third field fallow. Normally from 10% to 30% of the arable land in a three crop rotation system is fallow. Each field was rotated into a different crop nearly every year. Over the following two centuries, the regular planting of legumes in the fields that were previously fallow slowly restored the fertility of some croplands. The planting of legumes helped to increase plant growth in the empty field because of the ability of the bacteria on legume roots to fix nitrogen from the air into the soil in a form that plants could use. Other crops that were occasionally grown were flax and members of the mustard family.

Convertible husbandry was the alternation of a field between pasture and grain. Because nitrogen builds up slowly over time in pasture, ploughing up pasture and planting grains resulted in high yields for a few years. A big disadvantage of convertible husbandry was the hard work in breaking up pastures and difficulty in establishing them. The significance of convertible husbandry is that it introduced pasture into the rotation.

The farmers in Flanders (in parts of France and current day Belgium) discovered a still more effective four-field crop rotation system, using turnips and clover (a legume) as forage crops to replace the three-year crop rotation fallow year. The four-field rotation system allowed farmers to restore soil fertility and restore some of the plant nutrients removed with the crops. Turnips first show up in the probate records in England as early as 1638 but were not widely used till about 1750. Fallow land was about 20% of the arable area in England in 1700 before turnips and clover were extensively grown in the 1830s.  Guano and nitrates from South America were introduced in the mid-19th century, and fallow steadily declined to reach only about 4% in 1900. Ideally, wheat, barley, turnips and clover would be planted in that order in each field in successive years. The turnips helped keep the weeds down and were an excellent forage crop—ruminant animals could eat the tops and roots through a large part of the summer and winters. There was no need to let the soil lie fallow as clover would add nitrates (nitrogen-containing salts) back to the soil. The clover made excellent pasture and hay fields as well as green manure when it was ploughed under after one or two years. The addition of clover and turnips allowed more animals to be kept through the winter, which in turn produced more milk, cheese, meat and manure, which maintained soil fertility.

The mix of crops also changed: the area under wheat rose by 1870 to 3.5 million acres (1.4m ha), barley to 2.25m acres (0.9m ha) and oats less dramatically to 2.75m acres (1.1m ha), while rye dwindled to 60,000 acres (25,000 ha), less than a tenth of its late medieval peak. Grain yields benefited from new and better seed alongside improved rotation and fertility: wheat yields increased by a quarter in the 18th century and nearly half in the 19th, averaging 30 bushels per acre (2,080 kg/ha) by the 1890s.

Dutch and Rotherham swing (wheel-less) plough
The Dutch acquired the iron-tipped, curved mouldboard, adjustable depth plough from the Chinese in the early 17th century. It had the advantage of being able to be pulled by one or two oxen compared to the six or eight needed by the heavy wheeled northern European plough. The Dutch plough was brought to Britain by Dutch contractors who were hired to drain East Anglian fens and Somerset moors.  The plough was extremely successful on wet, boggy soil, but was soon used on ordinary land as well.

British improvements included Joseph Foljambe's cast iron plough (patented 1730), which combined an earlier Dutch design with several innovations. Its fittings and coulter were made of iron, and the mouldboard and share were covered with an iron plate, making it easier to pull and more controllable than previous ploughs. By the 1760s Foljambe was making large numbers of these ploughs in a factory outside of Rotherham, using standard patterns with interchangeable parts. The plough was easy for a blacksmith to make, but by the end of the 18th century it was being made in rural foundries. By 1770 it was the cheapest and best plough available. It spread to Scotland, America, and France.

New crops
The Columbian exchange brought many new foodstuffs from the Americas to Eurasia, most of which took decades or centuries to catch on. Arguably the most important of these was the potato. Potatoes yielded about three times the calories per acre of wheat or barley, mainly because it took only taking 3–4 months to mature versus 10 months for wheat. On top of this, potatoes had higher nutritive value than wheat, could be grown in even fallow and nutrient-poor soil, did not require any special tools, and were considered fairly appetizing. According to Langer, a single acre of potatoes could feed a family of five or six, plus a cow, for the better part of a year, an unprecedented level of production. By 1715 the potato was widespread in the Low Countries, the Rhineland, southwestern Germany, and eastern France, but took longer to spread elsewhere.

The Royal Society of London for Improving Natural Knowledge, established in 1660, almost immediately championed the potato, stressing its value as a substitute for wheat (particularly since famine periods for wheat overlapped with bump periods for potatoes). The 1740 famines buttressed their case. The mid 18th century was marked by rapid adoption of the potato by various European countries, especially in central Europe, as various wheat famines demonstrated its value. The potato was grown in Ireland, a property of the English crown and common source of food exports, since the early 17th century and quickly spread so that by the 18th century it had been firmly established as a staple food. It spread to England shortly after it took hold in Ireland, first being widely cultivated in Lancashire and around London, and by the mid-18th century it was esteemed and common. By the late 18th century, Sir Frederick Eden wrote that the potato had become "a constant standing dish, at every meal, breakfast excepted, at the tables of the Rich, as well as the Poor."

While not as vital as the potato, maize also contributed to the boost of Western European agricultural productivity. Maize also had far higher per-acre productivity than wheat (about two and a half times), grew at widely differing altitudes and in a variety of soils (though warmer climates were preferred), and unlike wheat it could be harvested in successive years from the same plot of land. It was often grown alongside potatoes, as maize plants required wide spacing. Maize was cultivated in Spain since 1525 and Italy since 1530, contributing to their growing populations in the early modern era as it became a dietary staple in the 17th century (in Italy it was often made into polenta). It spread from northern Italy into Germany and beyond, becoming an important staple in the Habsburg monarchy (especially Hungary and Austria) by the late 17th century. Its spread started in southern France in 1565, and by the start of the 18th century it was the main food source of central and southern French peasants (it was more popular as animal fodder in the north).

Enclosure

In Europe, agriculture was feudal from the Middle Ages. In the traditional open-field system, many subsistence farmers cropped strips of land in large fields held in common and divided the produce. They typically worked under the auspices of the aristocracy or the Catholic Church, who owned much of the land.

As early as the 12th century, some fields in England tilled under the open-field system were enclosed into individually owned fields. The Black Death from 1348 onward accelerated the break-up of the feudal system in England. Many farms were bought by yeomen who enclosed their property and improved their use of the land. More secure control of the land allowed the owners to make innovations that improved their yields. Other husbandmen rented property they "share cropped" with the land owners. Many of these enclosures were accomplished by acts of Parliament in the 16th and 17th centuries.

The process of enclosing property accelerated in the 15th and 16th centuries. The more productive enclosed farms meant that fewer farmers were needed to work the same land, leaving many villagers without land and grazing rights. Many of them moved to the cities in search of work in the emerging factories of the Industrial Revolution. Others settled in the English colonies. English Poor Laws were enacted to help these newly poor.

Some practices of enclosure were denounced by the Church, and legislation was drawn up against it; but the large, enclosed fields were needed for the gains in agricultural productivity from the 16th to 18th centuries. This controversy led to a series of government acts, culminating in the General Enclosure Act of 1801 which sanctioned large-scale land reform. The process of enclosure was largely complete by the end of the 18th century.

Development of a national market
Regional markets were widespread by 1500 with about 800 locations in Britain. The most important development between the 16th century and the mid-19th century was private marketing. By the 19th century, marketing was nationwide, and the vast majority of agricultural production was for market rather than for the farmer and his family.  The 16th-century market radius was about 10 miles, which could support a town of 10,000.
  
The next stage of development was trading between markets, requiring merchants, credit and forward sales, knowledge of markets and pricing and of supply and demand in different markets. Eventually, the market evolved into a national one driven by London and other growing cities. By 1700, there was a national market for wheat.

Legislation regulating middlemen required registration, addressed weights and measures, fixing of prices and collection of tolls by the government. Market regulations were eased in 1663 when people were allowed some self-regulation to hold inventory, but it was forbidden to withhold commodities from the market in an effort to increase prices. In the late 18th century, the idea of self-regulation was gaining acceptance. The lack of internal tariffs, customs barriers and feudal tolls made Britain "the largest coherent market in Europe".

Transportation infrastructures
High wagon transportation costs made it uneconomical to ship commodities very far outside the market radius by road, generally limiting shipment to less than 20 or 30 miles to market or to a navigable waterway. Water transport was, and in some cases still is, much more efficient than land transport. In the early 19th century it cost as much to transport a ton of freight 32 miles by wagon over an unimproved road as it did to ship it 3,000 miles across the Atlantic. A horse could pull at most one ton of freight on a macadam road, which was multi-layer stone covered and crowned, with side drainage. But a single horse could pull a barge weighing over 30 tons.

Commerce was aided by the expansion of roads and inland waterways. Road transport capacity grew from threefold to fourfold from 1500 to 1700. Railroads would eventually reduce the cost of land transport by over 95%.

Land conversion, drainage and reclamation
Another way to get more land was to convert some pasture land into arable land and recover fen land and some pastures. It is estimated that the amount of arable land in Britain grew by 10–30% through these land conversions.

The British Agricultural Revolution was aided by land maintenance advancements in Flanders and the Netherlands. With large and dense populations in Flanders and Holland, farmers there were forced to take maximum advantage of every bit of usable land; the country had become a pioneer in canal building, soil restoration and maintenance, soil drainage, and land reclamation technology. Dutch experts like Cornelius Vermuyden brought some of this technology to Britain.

Water-meadows were utilised in the late 16th to the 20th centuries and allowed earlier pasturing of livestock after they were wintered on hay. This increased livestock yields, giving more hides, meat, milk, and manure as well as better hay crops.

Rise in domestic farmers
With the development of regional markets and eventually a national market, aided by improved transportation infrastructures, farmers were no longer dependent on their local market and were less subject to having to sell at low prices into an oversupplied local market and not being able to sell their surpluses to distant localities that were experiencing shortages. They also became less subject to price fixing regulations. Farming became a business rather than solely a means of subsistence.

Under free-market capitalism, farmers had to remain competitive. To be successful, farmers had to become effective managers who incorporated the latest farming innovations in order to be low cost producers.

Human capital effects 
During the 18th century, a high share of farmers were literate and had basic numerical skills, both of which are skills that were far from widespread in the early modern period. This is unsurprising for countries such as England, where farmers developed particularly high human capital skills because of rapid occupational changes—they became a minority that produced the food for the majority of the population. However, the ‘farmer effect’ of high human capital among farmers applies both to the center and the periphery of Europe. 

One possible explanation for this phenomenon is that a constant amount of nutrition was almost always available to farmer families. They could feed themselves even during times of famine by increasing the share of their products that they consumed themselves instead of selling them on markets. There is a strong link between nutritional deprivation and cognitive abilities, therefore it seems likely that farmers were one of the groups of society that contributed significantly to the numeracy revolution achieved in Europe during the early modern era.

Selective breeding of livestock
In England, Robert Bakewell and Thomas Coke introduced selective breeding as a scientific practice, mating together two animals with particularly desirable characteristics and also using inbreeding or the mating of close relatives, such as father and daughter, or brother and sister, to stabilise certain qualities in order to reduce genetic diversity in desirable animal programmes from the mid-18th century. Arguably, Bakewell's most important breeding programme was with sheep. Using native stock, he was able to quickly select for large, yet fine-boned sheep, with long, lustrous wool. The Lincoln Longwool was improved by Bakewell, and in turn the Lincoln was used to develop the subsequent breed, named the Dishley Leicester. It was hornless and had a square, meaty body with straight top lines.

Bakewell was also the first to breed cattle to be used primarily for beef. Previously, cattle were first and foremost kept for pulling ploughs as oxen or for dairy uses, with beef from surplus males as an additional bonus, but he crossed long-horned heifers and a Westmoreland bull to eventually create the Dishley Longhorn. As more farmers followed his lead, farm animals increased dramatically in size and quality. The average weight of a bull sold for slaughter at Smithfield was reported around 1700 as 370 pounds (170 kg), though this is considered a low estimate: by 1786, weights of 840 pounds (380 kg) were reported, though other contemporary indicators suggest an increase of around a quarter over the intervening century. In 1300, the average milk cow produced 100 gallons of milk annually. By 1800, this figure rose to 566 gallons.

Climatic amelioration 
One work by historian Max Ostrovsky outlines the chronology of the Second Agricultural Revolution in space:
17th century - Netherlands and Britain;
18th century - France;
19th century - German lands;
late 19th century - Russia.
Ostrovsky interprets the above chronology: "This is how the Atlantic cyclons advanced and the Siberian anti-cyclons retreated."

The light plow, he says, was used all around the Mediterranean since antiquity and iron-tipped several centuries earlier than in China. The complication was that it did not work in the climatic conditions of the medieval northern Europe.

Ostrovsky tried to reduce the complexity and multiplicity of factors in the research on the Second Revolution (small part of these factors are listed above). Social and economic changes he defines as a result rather than cause of the Revolution. Railroads, he adds, do not increase yields. Increase in farm area does, but it was not the discovery of the 17th century. The first Neolithic farmer knew it.

Having researched the First Revolution, Ostrovsky supposed the influence of climate over agricultural technology and methods. He dusted off the researches of Ellsworth Huntington and continued where Huntington stopped, focusing on cyclons rather than temperature. The expanding warm cyclons, he concludes, were the trigger.

19th century
Besides the organic fertilisers in manure, new fertilisers were slowly discovered. Massive sodium nitrate (NaNO3) deposits found in the Atacama Desert, Chile, were brought under British financiers like John Thomas North and imports were started. Chile was happy to allow the exports of these sodium nitrates by allowing the British to use their capital to develop the mining and imposing a hefty export tax to enrich their treasury. Massive deposits of sea bird guano (11–16% nitrogen, 8–12% phosphate, and 2–3% potassium), were found and started to be imported after about 1830. Significant imports of potash obtained from the ashes of trees burned in opening new agricultural lands were imported. 

By-products of the British meat industry like bones from the knackers' yards were ground up or crushed and sold as fertiliser. By about 1840 about 30,000 tons of bones were being processed (worth about £150,000). An unusual alternative to bones was found to be the millions of tons of fossils called coprolites found in South East England. When these were dissolved in sulphuric acid they yielded a high phosphate mixture (called "super phosphate") that plants could absorb readily and increased crop yields. Mining coprolite and processing it for fertiliser soon developed into a major industry—the first commercial fertiliser. 

Higher yield per acre crops were planted as potatoes went from about 300,000 acres in 1800 to about 400,000 acres in 1850 with a further increase to about 500,000 in 1900. Labour productivity slowly increased at about 0.6% per year. With more capital invested, more organic and inorganic fertilisers, and better crop yields increased the food grown at about 0.5% per year—not enough to keep up with population growth.

Great Britain contained about 10.8 million people in 1801, 20.7 million in 1851 and 37.1 million by 1901. This corresponds to an annual population growth rate of 1.3% in 1801-1851 and 1.2% in 1851–1901, twice the rate of agricultural output growth. In addition to land for cultivation there was also a demand for pasture land to support more livestock. The growth of arable acreage slowed from the 1830s and went into reverse from the 1870s in the face of cheaper grain imports, and wheat acreage nearly halved from 1870 to 1900.

The recovery of food imports after the Napoleonic Wars (1803–1815) and the resumption of American trade following the War of 1812 (1812–1815) led to the enactment in 1815 of the Corn Laws (protective tariffs) to protect cereal grain producers in Britain against foreign competition. These laws were removed in 1846 after the onset of the Great Irish Famine in which a potato blight ruined most of the Irish potato crop and brought famine to the Irish people from 1846 to 1850. Though the blight also struck Scotland, Wales, England, and much of continental Europe, its effect there was far less severe since potatoes constituted a much smaller percentage of the diet than in Ireland. Hundreds of thousands died in the famine, and millions more emigrated to England, Wales, Scotland, Canada, Australia, Europe, and the United States, reducing the population from about 8.5 million in 1845 to 4.3 million by 1921.

Between 1873 and 1879 British agriculture suffered from wet summers that damaged grain crops. Cattle farmers were hit by foot-and-mouth disease, and sheep farmers by liver rot. The poor harvests, however, masked a greater threat to British agriculture: growing imports of foodstuffs from abroad. The development of the steam ship and the development of extensive railway networks in Britain and in the United States allowed U.S. farmers with much larger and more productive farms to export hard grain to Britain at a price that undercut the British farmers. At the same time, large amounts of cheap corned beef started to arrive from Argentina, and the opening of the Suez Canal in 1869 and the development of refrigerator ships (reefers) in about 1880 opened the British market to cheap meat and wool from Australia, New Zealand, and Argentina. 

The Long Depression was a worldwide economic recession that began in 1873 and ended around 1896. It hit the agricultural sector hard and was the most severe in Europe and the United States, which had been experiencing strong economic growth fuelled by the Second Industrial Revolution in the decade following the American Civil War. By 1900, half the meat eaten in Britain came from abroad, and tropical fruits such as bananas were also being imported on the refrigerator ships.

Seed planting
Before the introduction of the seed drill, the common practice was to plant seeds by broadcasting (evenly throwing) them across the ground by hand on the prepared soil and then lightly harrowing the soil to cover the seed. Seeds left on top of the ground were eaten by birds, insects, and mice. There was no control over spacing, and seeds were planted too close together and too far apart. Alternatively, seeds could be laboriously planted one by one using a hoe and/or a shovel. Cutting down on wasted seed was important because the yield of seeds harvested to seeds planted at that time was around four or five.

The seed drill was introduced from China to Italy in the mid-16th century where it was patented by the Venetian Senate. Jethro Tull invented an improved seed drill in 1701. It was a mechanical seeder which distributed seeds evenly across a plot of land and at the correct depth. Tull's seed drill was expensive and fragile and therefore did not have much of an impact. The technology to manufacture affordable and reliable machinery, including agricultural machinery, improved dramatically in the last half of the 19th century.

Significance
The Agricultural Revolution was part of a long process of improvement, but sound advice on farming began to appear in England in the mid-17th century, from writers such as Samuel Hartlib, Walter Blith and others, and the overall agricultural productivity of Britain started to grow significantly only in the 18th century. It is estimated that total agricultural output grew 2.7-fold between 1700 and 1870 and output per worker at a similar rate. Despite its name, the Agricultural Revolution in Britain did not result in overall productivity per hectare of agricultural area as high as in China, where intensive cultivation (including multiple annual cropping in many areas) had been practiced for many centuries.

The Agricultural Revolution in Britain proved to be a major turning point in history, allowing the population to far exceed earlier peaks and sustain the country's rise to industrial pre-eminence. Towards the end of the 19th century, the substantial gains in British agricultural productivity were rapidly offset by competition from cheaper imports, made possible by the exploitation of new lands and advances in transportation, refrigeration, and other technologies.

The Agricultural Revolution in other countries was turning point too. In the agrarian societies, four families produced enough food for five families, that is for themselves and one more family. Not much manpower was available for non-agricultural activity. In the course of the revolution, one family began to produce enough food for five families. Much manpower was liberated from agriculture and became available for industry. Thus the Agricultural Revolution made possible the Industrial Revolution:

Unprecedented population growth followed and even more explosive was the growth of the non-agricultural sector. Barrington Moore stressed the "importance of getting rid of agriculture as a major social activity" in the formation of the working class. First, "rural proletariat" appeared; later, this mass moved to cities causing unprecedented urbanization. When the percentage of manpower engaged in agriculture declined from 80 to 60, occurred great social revolutions or reformations (revolution from above). The result was not liberte, egalite, fraternite; often the result was the opposite, with stronger autocracy. But in all cases, the power shifted from land owners to industrial entrepreneurs or central-planning states, marking "revolutionary break with the past." The ten-millennia Agrarian Age was succeeded by the Industrial Age.

Today, agriculture accounts for 5% of the world product. But these 5% is the basis holding the rest 95% like a reverse pyramide. The Second Agricultural Revolution created this basis and made possible our industry and other sectors of the modern civilization. Without this basis all this civilization, with all its technological progress, would collapse. "No modern development made us independent from Earth Mother, or Pachamama that feeds, as the Inca put it."

See also
 Agriculture in the United Kingdom#History
 Scottish Agricultural Revolution

References

Sources

Further reading
 Ang, James B., Rajabrata Banerjee, and Jakob B. Madsen. "Innovation and productivity advances in British agriculture: 1620–1850". Southern Economic Journal 80.1 (2013): 162–186.
 Campbell, Bruce M. S., and Mark Overton. "A new perspective on medieval and early modern agriculture: six centuries of Norfolk farming c. 1250-c. 1850." Past and Present (1993): 38-105. .
 Clark, Gregory. "Too much revolution: Agriculture in the industrial revolution, 1700–1860". In The British Industrial Revolution: An Economic Perspective (2nd ed. 1999) pp. 206–240.
 
 Fletcher, T. W. "The Great Depression of English Agriculture 1873–1896". Economic History Review (1961) 13#3 pp: 417–432. .
 
 
 Jones, E. L. “The Agricultural Labour Market in England, 1793-1872.” Economic History Review 17#2  1964, pp. 322–338. online
 
 Mingay, Gordon E. "The 'Agricultural Revolution' in English History: A Reconsideration". Agricultural History (1963): 123–133. .
 Mingay, Gordon E. (1977). The Agricultural Revolution: Changes in Agriculture, 1650–1880. (Documents in Economic History.) Adam & Charles Black. .
Niermeier-Dohoney, Justin. (2018). A Vital Matter: Alchemy, Cornucopianism, and Agricultural Improvement in Seventeenth-Century England, The University of Chicago.

Historiography
 Robert C. Allen. "Tracking the Agricultural Revolution in England". Economic History Review (1999) 52#2 pp. 209–235. .

External links
 "Agricultural Revolution in England 1500–1850"—BBC History

15th-century revolutions
16th-century revolutions
17th-century revolutions
18th-century revolutions
19th-century revolutions
Economic history of the United Kingdom
History of agriculture
History of agriculture in the United Kingdom
History of the British Isles
Agricultural revolutions